Melaenus is a genus of ground beetles in the family Carabidae. There are two described species in Melaenus.

Species
These two species belong to the genus Melaenus:
 Melaenus elegans Dejean, 1831  (Africa)
 Melaenus piger (Fabricius, 1801)  (India and Sri Lanka)

References

Carabidae